OXEN Peristeronas is a Cypriot football club based in Peristerona. Founded in 1950, it sometimes played in the Third and Fourth Divisions.

Honours
 Cypriot Fourth Division:
 Champions (2): 1986 (Nicosia-Keryneia Group), 1992 (Nicosia-Keryneia Group)

References

Football clubs in Cyprus
Association football clubs established in 1950
1950 establishments in Cyprus